The 1912 Volta a Catalunya was the second edition of the Volta a Catalunya cycle race and was held from 6 April to 8 April 1912. The race started and finished in Barcelona. The race was won by José Magdalena.

Route and stages

General classification

References

1912
Volta
1912 in Spanish road cycling
April 1912 sports events